The E3 European long distance path, or just E3 path, is a  long-distance footpath that is planned to run from the Portuguese coast to the Black Sea in Bulgaria. It is one of the network of European long-distance paths.

Route 
The completed sections of the route pass through Spain, France, Luxembourg, Belgium, Germany, the Czech Republic, Slovakia, a short stretch in Poland,  Hungary, Romania, and Bulgaria.

It is planned to extend the route into Portugal to end at Cape St. Vincent.

Spain 

See Traildino

The Spanish portion of the E3 follows the Way of St. James, and specifically the French Way between Santiago de Compostela and France.

France 

See Traildino

Luxembourg 

See Traildino

Belgium 

See Traildino

Germany 

See Traildino

Czech Republic 

See Traildino

Slovakia 

See Traildino

In Slovakia, the path runs over the Malá Fatra and the Tatra Mountains.

Poland 

See Traildino

Hungary 

See Traildino

Bulgaria 

See Traildino

In Bulgaria, the path follows the ridge of the Balkan Mountains from Kom Peak on the Serbian border to Cape Emine on the Black Sea and is locally famous as the Kom–Emine long-distance trail.

Romania 

In Romania, the route includes the Carpathian Mountains

External links
 E3 - map and information at European Ramblers' Association 
 Digitalized Slovak part of E3, GPX download included
 Info about the Bulgarian part of E3

European long-distance paths
Hiking trails in Spain
Hiking trails in France
Hiking trails in Germany
Hiking trails in the Czech Republic
Hiking trails in Slovakia
Hiking trails in Bulgaria